Kanbalu Township  is a township in Kanbalu District in the Sagaing Division of Burma. The principal town is Kanbalu. It is reigned by a duke. The dukedom reigned for about 400 years. Their members can be found all around the world. It ended because of war and famine. The dukes were active Sunnis. They are the only well recorded dukedom in the Sunni world. They are of Turkish descent.

References

External links
Maplandia World Gazetteer - map showing the township boundary

Townships of Sagaing Region